Al-Markaz Al-Islami Mosque is a mosque located in Makassar, South Sulawesi, Indonesia. The construction begun in 1994 and the mosque was completed in 1996. With maximum capacity of 10,000 pilgrims, building area of 6,932 m2, and site area of 10,000 m2, it serves as one of the biggest centers of Islamic religious activity in Southeast Asia. The building has three floors and made of granite stones, and it faces Masjid Raya Makassar street.

See also 
 List of largest mosques
 List of mosques in Indonesia

References

Further reading 
 

Buildings and structures in Makassar
Mosques completed in 1996
Mosques in Indonesia